The badminton mixed doubles tournament at the 2018 Asian Games in Jakarta took place from 23 to 27 August at Istora Gelora Bung Karno.

Schedule
All times are Western Indonesia Time (UTC+07:00)

Results

Final

Top half

Bottom half

References

External links
Schedule

Badminton at the 2018 Asian Games